The following are members of the United States House of Representatives who switched parties while serving in Congress.

See also
List of United States senators who switched parties
List of party switchers in the United States
Party switching

References

Switch
United States Representatives
Political history of the United States
American politicians who switched parties